Raynal is a surname. Notable people with the surname include:

 Aline Marie Raynal (born 1937), French botanist and botanical illustrator
 David Raynal (1840–1903), French politician
 Étienne Weill-Raynal (1887–1982), French historian, resistant, journalist and Socialist politician
 François Édouard Raynal (1830–1898), French sailor
 Frédérick Raynal (born 1966), French video game designer and programmer
 Guillaume Thomas François Raynal (1713–1796), French writer
 Jean Raynal (1929–2015), French sports journalist
 Mathieu Raynal, French rugby union referee
 Maurice Raynal (1884–1954), French art critic
 Michel Raynal (born 1949), French computer scientist
 Sylvain Eugène Raynal (1867–1939), French military officer